Benjamín Alvarado (born 2 September 1985) is a Chilean professional golfer.

Alvarado was born in Santiago, Chile. He played college golf at Arizona State University, earning All-American honors in 2006 and 2007. He turned professional in 2007.

Alvarado has played on the Challenge Tour in 2008 and 2009; the Tour de las Américas, winning twice in 2011 and finishing second on the Order of Merit; the Canadian Tour, finishing third on the Order of Merit in 2011; PGA Tour Latinoamérica, finishing 23rd on the 2012 Order of Merit; and the Web.com Tour, winning the 2013 Brasil Classic to earn his tour card. Alvarado is the first Chilean winner on the Web.com Tour and was a last-minute sponsor exemption for the Brazil event. He finished 11th on the 2013 Web.com Tour regular-season money list to earn his 2014 PGA Tour card. Alvarado is the first Chilean to earn a PGA Tour card. In 2013–14, he made only one cut in six events, finished 240th on the FedEx Cup points list and lost his PGA Tour card.

Amateur wins
 2001 South American Championship
 2002 Junior Orange Bowl

Professional wins (7)

Web.com Tour wins (1)

Tour de las Américas wins (2)

PGA Tour Latinoamérica Developmental Series wins (1)

Other wins (3)
 2003 Abierto de Chile (as an amateur)
 2007 Abierto Hacienda Chicureo (Chile)
 2008 Abierto Hacienda Chicureo (Chile)

Team appearances
 Eisenhower Trophy (representing Chile): 2002, 2004, 2006

See also
 2013 Web.com Tour Finals graduates

References

External links
  
 
 
 
 

Chilean male golfers
Arizona State Sun Devils men's golfers
PGA Tour Latinoamérica golfers
PGA Tour golfers
European Tour golfers
Korn Ferry Tour graduates
Sportspeople from Santiago
1985 births
Living people
21st-century Chilean people